Boardman High School is a high school in Boardman Township, Ohio, United States. It is the only high school in the Boardman Local School District. Athletic teams compete as the Boardman Spartans in the Ohio High School Athletic Association as a member of the All-American Conference.

History
The first high school, located on Market Street, is now Boardman Center Intermediate School. In 1969, the new high school was built on Glenwood Avenue. In 2000, a new performing arts center was added on by donation. As of the 2021-2022 school year, the school principal is Mark Zura.

Extracurriculars

The Boardman Spartan Marching Band
Over the years, Boardman High School's marching band has become not only a symbol for the school, but a symbol within the state. It is a nationally recognized band, frequently taking trips to events such as the Rose Bowl, professional football games, and the Indy 500. Every year the band is invited on several highly recognized trips, usually accepting between one and two invites. During the winter, the band splits into separate bands: wind ensemble (the highest performance level), symphonic band, concert band and freshman band (consisting of a majority of all incoming freshmen, with the exception of those in jazz or orchestra).

Music
In 2006, the music department was selected a "Grammy Signature School" and received a $1,000 award. The music department was one of 16 schools selected for this honor. The department consists of award-winning choral, band, and orchestra departments.

Quiz Bowl
Boardman's quiz bowl program has consistently been competitive in the 24-school Mahoning Valley League, winning consecutive league championships from 2015-2018. The team qualified for and attended the National Academic Quiz Tournaments High School National Championship Tournament in 2015, 2017, and 2018. During the 2017-18 season, Boardman was ranked in the top 5 in Ohio and the top 100 in the nation. Boardman finished tied for 32nd place in the 2018 high school national tournament.

Productions
Boardman started a film and broadcast program in 1992 by Allan Butcher, called BSTN Productions. It started at Boardman Center Middle School. When the Performing Arts Center was added to the high school in 2000, they moved the main program to the high school. Since the year 2000, the BSTN program has become an award winning curriculum. They have also branched to their new Spartan Stadium (2015) running the Jumbo Tron and livestreams. The program currently offers 4 different courses: Broadcast Journalism, Digital Video Productions, Advanced Digital Video Productions, and Film Studies. The program is currently directed by Joe Hollabaugh.

Sports
Boardman competes in the All-American Conference.

The Boardman Schools opened Boardman Spartan Stadium in 2015, replacing Center Field at Center Intermediate School. Boasting seating for over 7,000 and a 35x20ft video screen, one of the largest in the Midwest of the United States, the stadium should be finished in 2017.

Ohio High School Athletic Association State Championships

 Girls' softball: 2001 
 Girls' bowling: 2010

Notable alumni
 Terence Dials, former Ohio State basketball player and 2006 Big Ten Player of the Year, went undrafted; played professionally in Europe
 Dave Dravecky, Major League Baseball pitcher (San Diego Padres, San Francisco Giants), 1982–1989; known for his comeback from bone cancer in his pitching arm, which ultimately ended his career and resulted in its amputation
 D. J. Durkin, defensive coordinator for the Texas A&M Aggies football team (class of 1996)
 John Greco, retired NFL guard; selected in third round of 2008 NFL Draft by the St. Louis Rams from University of Toledo (Class of 2003)
 Elizabeth Hartman, Academy Award-nominated actress (A Patch of Blue)
 Phil Keaggy, Christian artist, guitarist and former member of Glass Harp (attended BHS but is not a graduate)
 Bernie Kosar, retired National Football League quarterback; won national championship at University of Miami before beginning his professional career, mostly with the Cleveland Browns (class of 1982)
 Nanette Lepore, fashion designer
 Corey Linsley, National Football League center for the Los Angeles Chargers; selected in fifth round of 2014 NFL Draft from Ohio State (Class of 2009)
 Maureen McGovern, singer ("The Morning After," "Can You Read My Mind") and Broadway actress
 Mike Rice Jr., former head coach of Rutgers University men's basketball, fired for physically and verbally abusing his players
 Sandra Scheuer, killed by Ohio National Guardsmen during Kent State shootings on May 4, 1970
 Joe Schiavoni, Mahoning County judge, former Ohio state Senator
 Steve Vallos, retired NFL center, played for Wake Forest, selected in seventh round of 2007 NFL Draft by the Seattle Seahawks (class of 2002)

References

External links
 District website
 High School website

High schools in Mahoning County, Ohio
Public high schools in Ohio
1969 establishments in Ohio
Educational institutions established in 1969